Yeelirrie may refer to:
Yeelirrie Station, a pastoral station in Western Australia
Yeelirrie uranium project, a uranium deposit on the site of the station